Styrax benzoin is a species of tree native to Sumatra in Indonesia. Common names for the tree include gum benjamin tree, loban (in Arabic), kemenyan (in Indonesia and Malaysia), onycha, and Sumatra benzoin tree.

Distribution
It is a common member of the forests of  Sumatra, Indonesia, where it grows to about 12-30 meters in height. Styrax benzoin can live 70-100 years. It is unknown how it came to Sumatra. Scientists says styrax benzoin from Sumatra has the best quality. 

The process of tapping and harvesting frankincense takes one year. The styrax benzoin tree trunk is cut slightly, so that the white styrax sap will appear from the skin. After 4-6 months of the styrax sap hardens on the tree trunks at which point the sap can be harvested.

The sap that has been harvested is not clean and is dried for 3 to 6 months to remove impurities. After the sap has dried, it is ready for export.

You can find incense trees in several countries in Southeast Asia, such as Malaysia, Laos, Vietnam and Indonesia. The tree can thrive in mountainous areas and cold temperatures with high rainfall. Styrax trees can also grow in lowland areas with hot temperatures but these do not produce good quality styrax sap.

Cultivation
Styrax benzoin is cultivated as a main source of benzoin resin in Indonesia. It is also grown as an ornamental tree for shade in West Africa.

See also
Styrax — 'Uses of resin' section

References

benzoin
Trees of Sumatra
Garden plants of Asia
Ornamental trees
Plants described in 1787